Stephen McHattie Smith (born February 3, 1947) is a Canadian actor. Since beginning his professional career in 1970, he has amassed over 200 film and television credits. He won the Genie Award for Best Supporting Actor for his performance in The Rocket, and a Gemini Award for Life with Billy.

Life and career
McHattie was born in Antigonish, Nova Scotia, on February 3, 1946 (the year of his birth has also been cited as 1945, 1947, and 1948). An alumnus of the American Academy of Dramatic Arts, he has appeared in many films and television shows including Star Trek: Deep Space Nine, Star Trek: Enterprise, Highlander: The Series, and American Playhouse's Life Under Water (1989). His roles include  300, A History of Violence, The Fountain, Secretary, Shoot 'Em Up, Life with Billy, One Dead Indian, Beverly Hills Cop III. In Canada, he appeared in Canada: A People's History as Canadian hero Major-General Sir Isaac Brock, and in The Rocket  as coach Dick Irvin.

He portrayed an extraordinary USMC sniper (based on real life sniper Carlos Hathcock) in the JAG season one episode "High Ground". In 1976, he played iconic American actor James Dean in the television film James Dean, a television adaptation of the biography written by Dean's friend and writer William Bast. McHattie appeared in several mini-series, including Centennial and Roughnecks.

McHattie appeared in several episodes of Seinfeld (beginning with "The Pitch") as Dr. Reston, Elaine Benes's manipulative psychiatrist boyfriend; he also appeared in two episodes of The X-Files. From 1998 to 2000, he had a recurring role in the Canadian-made TV series Emily of New Moon, based upon the 1923 novel by Lucy Maud Montgomery. From 1999 to 2001, he portrayed Sgt. Frank Coscarella in the Canadian police procedural drama, Cold Squad. Since 2005, he has appeared as Captain Healy, Massachusetts State Police Homicide Division Commander, in the first eight of the Jesse Stone series, which are based on the novels of Robert B. Parker. He did not appear in the ninth instalment however. He appeared in the pilot of Sabbatical, voiced the villain The Shade in Justice League, and portrayed Hollis Mason, the first Nite Owl, in the film adaptation of Watchmen.

McHattie had a memorable and well-received appearance in the acclaimed sixth-season episode "In the Pale Moonlight"
of Star Trek: Deep Space Nine, as the acerbic and skeptical Romulan Senator Vreenak who is the target of a Federation false flag operation to deceive the neutral Romulan Empire into declaring war on the Dominion. The episode has often been cited as one of the best episodes of Star Trek ever produced, and McHattie's outraged, hissing delivery of the line "It’s a Fake!," upon the discovery of a forged data rod, has been ranked amongst the greatest moments in Star Trek and spawned a popular and enduring online meme.

In 2009, McHattie appeared in the Canadian IFC film Pontypool and in the Canadian thriller Summer's Blood as Gant Hoxey, alongside Twilight actress Ashley Greene, who portrays Summer. He co-starred with Felicia Day and Kavan Smith in the Gothic adaptation of Red Riding Hood, Red: Werewolf Hunter. In 2015, he appeared in the supernatural thriller Pay the Ghost.

Personal life
McHattie is married to actress Lisa Houle, with whom he has three children. He was previously married to actress Meg Foster. His older brother is actor Wendell Smith.

Filmography

Television

Awards and recognition
1995: Gemini Award for Best Performance by an Actor in a Leading Role in a Dramatic Program or Mini-Series for Life with Billy.
2006: Genie Award for Actor in a Supporting Role for Maurice Richard (The Rocket).

References

External links

1946 births
American Academy of Dramatic Arts alumni
Best Supporting Actor Genie and Canadian Screen Award winners
Canadian male film actors
Canadian male television actors
Canadian male voice actors
Living people
Male actors from Nova Scotia
People from Antigonish, Nova Scotia